Artiach was a Spanish professional cycling team that existed from 1984 to 1995. It was merged into the  team for the 1996 season, becoming . Pedro Delgado won the general classification of the 1985 Vuelta a España with the team.

1995 Roster
As at 31 December 1995

Major wins

Sources:
1984
 Stage 4 Volta a la Comunitat Valenciana, Pello Ruiz
 Stage 2 Setmana Catalana de Ciclisme, Felipe Yáñez De La Torre
 Stage 2 Tour of the Basque Country, Jon Koldo Urien Gomez
 Stage 2 Volta a Galicia, Jokin Mújika
1985
 Stage 4 Vuelta a Murcia, Felipe Yáñez De La Torre
  Overall Tour of the Basque Country, Pello Ruiz
 Stage 5 Vuelta a Cantabria, Manuel Murga Sáez De Ormijana
 Stage 4 Vuelta a Castilla y León, Mathieu Hermans
  Overall Vuelta a España, Pedro Delgado
Stage 6, Pedro Delgado
Stage 17, Pello Ruiz
 Stage 17 Tour de France, Pedro Delgado
 Stage 4 Vuelta a Burgos, Santiago Izuzkiza Aguirrebengoa
 Prologue and Stage 5 Griffin 1000, Manuel Jorge Domínguez
 Stage 7 Vuelta a Castilla y León, Felipe Yáñez De La Torre
1986
 Vuelta al Bidasoa, Jesus Arambarri Arregui
 Vuelta a Murcia
Stage 2, Manuel Jorge Domínguez
Stage 3 TTT
 Vuelta a España
Stage 2, Manuel Jorge Domínguez
Stage 8, Marino Lejarreta
 Stage 3 Tour de Romandie, Mathieu Hermans
 Stage 5 Vuelta a los Valles Mineros, Jaime Vilamajo Ipiens
 Stages 2 & 7 Vuelta a Aragón, Mathieu Hermans
 Stage 3 GP du Midi Libre, Pello Ruiz
 Stage 5 Vuelta a Cantabria, Jose Salvador Sanchis
 Stage 9 Vuelta a Castilla y León, Vicente Ridaura
 Stage 4 Tour de France, Pello Ruiz
 Overall Vuelta a Burgos, Marino Lejarreta
 Trofeo Masferrer, Antonio Esparza
 Stage 7 Volta Catalunya, Pello Ruiz
 Stage 3 Vuelta a La Rioja, Manuel Jorge Domínguez
 Subida al Naranco, Marino Lejarreta
 Memorial Manuel Galera, Vicente Ridaura
1987
 Stage 4 Vuelta a Andalucía, Pascal Jules
 GP Albacete, Marcel Arntz
 GP Camp de Morvedre, Roland Le Clerc
 Trofeo Luis Puig, Pello Ruiz
 Stages 1, 2 & 3 Comunitat Valenciana, Mathieu Hermans
 Overall Vuelta a Murcia, Pello Ruiz
Stages 4 & 6, Pello Ruiz
 Stage 2 Vuelta a Castilla y León, Pello Ruiz
 Paris–Camembert, Mathieu Hermans
 Vuelta a España
Stages 9 & 15, Antonio Esparza
Stage 22, Jaime Vilamajo Ipiens
 Stage 1 Vuelta a los Valles Mineros, Antonio Esparza
 Stage 6 Vuelta a Asturias, Manuel Murga Sáez De Ormijana
 Overall Euskal Bizikleta, Marino Lejarreta
 GP Caboalles de Abajo, Pello Ruiz
 Gran Premio de Llodio, Pello Ruiz
 Overall Vuelta a Burgos, Marino Lejarreta
Prologue & Stage 5, Marino Lejarreta
Stage 2 TTT
 Clásica Ciclista de San Sebastián, Marino Lejarreta
 Subida a Urkiola, Marino Lejarreta
 Stage 4 Ronde van Nederland, Mathieu Hermans
 Volta a Galicia, Jokin Mújika
1988
 GP Albacete, Mathieu Hermans
 Stages 3 & 6 Comunitat Valenciana, Mathieu Hermans
 Vuelta a Murcia
Stages 1, 2, 3 & 4, Mathieu Hermans
Stage 5, TTT
 Stages 1, 2 & 3 Setmana Catalana de Ciclisme, Mathieu Hermans
 Stages 4, 6, 7, 10, 16 & 21 Vuelta a España, Mathieu Hermans
 Overall Euskal Bizikleta, Jokin Mújika
Stage 3, Jokin Mújika
 Prueba Villafranca de Ordizia, Marino Lejarreta
 Overall Vuelta a Burgos, Marino Lejarreta
Prologue, Marino Lejarreta
 Subida a Urkiola, Marino Lejarreta
 Stage 4 Ronde van Nederland, Mathieu Hermans
 Volta a Galicia, Marino Lejarreta
 Trofeo Masferrer, Mathieu Hermans
 Stage 1 Volta Catalunya, Mathieu Hermans
 Overall Escalada a Montjuïc, Marino Lejarreta
Stages 1 & 2, Marino Lejarreta
1989
 Trofeo Luis Puig, Mathieu Hermans
 Grand Prix de Cannes, Roland Le Clerc
 Route du Pays Basque, Roland Le Clerc
 Klasika Primavera, Marino Lejarreta
 Omloop Leiedal, Ludo Peeters
 Vuelta a España
Stage 3 TTT
Stages 14, 15 & 20, Mathieu Hermans
 Tour de Luxembourg
Stage 1, Mathieu Hermans
Stage 5, Roland Le Clerc
 Stage 11 Tour de France, Mathieu Hermans
 Prueba Villafranca de Ordizia, Marino Lejarreta
 Clásica a los Puertos de Guadarrama, Jokin Mújika
 Overall Volta a Catalunya, Marino Lejarreta
Stage 1, Mathieu Hermans
 Stage 2 Vuelta a La Rioja, Marino Lejarreta
 Trio Normand, Roland Le Clerc
 Overall Herald Sun Tour, Marcel Arntz
Stage 11, Stephen Hodge
Stage 15, Marcel Arntz
1990
 Stage 7 Olympia's Tour, Dick Dekker
 Stages 3a, 4 & 6 Troféu Joaquim Agostinho, Neil Stephens
 Volta a Portugal
Stages 2 & 3, Dick Dekker
Stage 5, Neil Stephens
Stage 11, José Antonio Sanchez Valencia
 Stages 1 & 2 Vuelta Ciclista a La Rioja, Dick Dekker
 Stage 9 Herald Sun Tour, Neil Stephens
1991
 Stage 1 Troféu Joaquim Agostinho, Juan Carlos Arribas
 Volta a Portugal
Stage 2, José Antonio Sánchez
Stage 4, Vicente Juan Ridaura
Stage 5, José Santiago
1992
 Stages 3 & 4 Vuelta a Mallorca, Alfonso Gutiérrez
 Stage 2 Vuelta Asturias, Alfonso Gutiérrez
 Stages 2 & 4 Volta a Portugal, Asier Guenetxea
 Stage 5 Vuelta a Castilla y León, Asier Guenetxea
 Stage 9 Volta a Portugal, Vicente Juan Ridaura
1993
 Stage 1 Vuelta Ciclista a la Comunidad Valenciana, Alfonso Gutiérrez
 Vuelta a Murcia
Stage 3, Alfonso Gutiérrez
Stage 5b, Erwin Nijboer
 Stage 2 Vuelta a España, Alfonso Gutiérrez
 Grande Prémio Jornal de Notícias
Stage 4, Orlando Sergio Rodrigues
Stage 6, Américo José Neves Da Silva
 Clásica de Sabiñánigo, Asier Guenetxea
 Vuelta a Castilla y León
Stage 2, Asier Guenetxea
Stage 3, Alfonso Gutiérrez
 Volta a Portugal
Stage 5, Luis Espinosa
Stage 7, Américo José Neves Da Silva
 Stage 3 Vuelta a Burgos, Alfonso Gutiérrez
1994
 Circuito de Getxo, Orlando Sergio Rodrigues
 Vuelta a Mallorca
Stages 3a & 5, Alfonso Gutiérrez
Stage 3b, Asier Guenetxea
 Stage 2 Vuelta a los Valles Mineros, Juan Rodrigo Arenas
 Stage 5 Vuelta Asturias, Luis Alberto Camargo
  Portuguese National Road Race Championships, Orlando Sergio Rodrigues
 Troféu Joaquim Agostinho
Stage 1, Américo José Neves Da Silva
Stage 3, Asier Guenetxea
Stage 7, Orlando Sergio Rodrigues
 Overall Volta a Portugal, Orlando Sergio Rodrigues
Stage 3, Orlando Sergio Rodrigues
1995
 Trofeo Comunidad Foral de Navarra, Felix Manuel García Casas
 Stage 5a Vuelta Ciclista al Pais Vasco, Asiat Saitov
 Stage 3 Vuelta a los Valles Mineros, Rafael Ruiz
 Overall Volta ao Alentejo, Asiat Saitov
Stages 1 & 2, Asiat Saitov
 Stage 2 Grande Prémio Jornal de Notícias, Mariano Moreda
 Stage 3 Vuelta Ciclista a La Rioja, Mariano Moreda
  Russian National Road Race Championships, Asiat Saitov
 Overall Troféu Joaquim Agostinho, Orlando Sergio Rodrigues
Stages 1 & 2, Mariano Moreda
 Overall Volta a Portugal, Orlando Sergio Rodrigues
Stage 5, Orlando Sergio Rodrigues
 Stage 18 Vuelta a España, Asiat Saitov

Supplementary statistics
Sources

Notes

National champions
1994
  Portuguese National Road Race Championships, Orlando Sergio Rodrigues
1995
  Russian National Road Race Championships, Asiat Saitov

References

Cycling teams based in Spain
Defunct cycling teams based in Spain
1984 establishments in Spain
1995 disestablishments in Spain
Cycling teams established in 1984
Cycling teams disestablished in 1995